Passwords is the sixth studio album by American folk rock band Dawes. The album was released on June 22, 2018.

Track listing
All songs written by Taylor Goldsmith, except where noted.

Personnel
Taylor Goldsmith – lead vocals, guitar, piano, synth, electric sitar
Griffin Goldsmith – drums, percussion, background vocals
Wylie Gelber – bass
Lee Pardini – keyboards, piano, synth, vibraphone, kalimba, background vocals

Additional Musicians
Jonathan Wilson – guitar, drum machine, synth noise (tracks 1,2,4)
Lucius (Jess Wolfe, Holly Laessig) - background vocals (track 8)
Trevor Menear - slide guitar (track 3)
Josh Johnson - alto sax (track 10)
Peter Jacobson - cello (tracks 4,5,6,8)
Tom Lea - viola (tracks 4,5,6,8)
Luis Mascaro - violin (tracks 4,5,6,8)
Ina Veli - violin (tracks 4,5,6,8)

Charts

References 

2018 albums
Dawes (band) albums
Albums produced by Jonathan Wilson (musician)